The America Zone was one of the two regional zones of the 1936 International Lawn Tennis Challenge.

Due to the low number of competing South American teams, the North & Central America and South America Zones were scrapped and the Americas played in one unified zone. 4 teams entered the Americas Zone, with the winner going on to compete in the Inter-Zonal Final against the winner of the Europe Zone. Australia defeated United States in the final, and went on to face Germany in the Inter-Zonal Final.

Draw

Semifinals

United States vs. Mexico

Final

United States vs. Australia

References

External links
Davis Cup official website

Davis Cup Americas Zone
America Zone
International Lawn Tennis Challenge